Emeraude Toubia (born March 1, 1989) is a Canadian-born American actress. She portrayed Isabelle Lightwood on the Freeform fantasy series Shadowhunters. She previously appeared on the Venevisión telenovelas Cosita linda as Dulce Rincón and Voltea pa' que te enamores as Stephanie Karam.

Early life
Toubia was born in Montreal, Quebec. She was raised in Brownsville, Texas as an only child. Her mother, Mirta Sonia (née Solis), was born and raised in Ciudad Victoria, Mexico, and her father was Lebanese-American. Her paternal grandparents were from the Koura District, Lebanon.

As a child, she was professionally trained in classical ballet, flamenco, belly dance, and lyrical dance. Toubia attended Homer Hanna High School in Brownsville for her secondary education. Since the age of fifteen, Toubia had competed in several beauty pageants; she was crowned Miss South Texas, Miss Rio Grande Valley America, and Miss Teen Brownsville.

Career
In 1999, at the age of ten, Toubia made her first television appearance on Televisa's children's program El Mundo de los Niños. She became widely known in 2008, when she was selected to participate on the second season of the Univision beauty pageant series Nuestra Belleza Latina, where the participants were trained rigorously in acting, presenting, dancing and other activities; Toubia was voted first runner-up. Since then, she has been featured in advertisements for brands such as Maybelline, J. C. Penney, Sony, Garnier, and AT&T.

In 2009, she joined the second season of Model Latina, finishing in fifth place. She was then a semifinalist in Miss Texas USA 2010. From 2011 to 2013, Toubia served as a presenter for several NBC Universo music and entertainment shows, including The Arena, 18 & Over, and mun2POP. She co-hosted the mun2 red carpet special for the 2013 Billboard Latin Music Awards. In 2013, Toubia made her acting debut as Elizabeth on the Nickelodeon Latin America youth telenovela 11-11: En mi cuadra nada cuadra, for which she was coached by Academy Award-nominated actress Adriana Barraza.

In 2014, she appeared as Dulce Rincón on Venevisión's telenovela Cosita linda. The following year, Toubia portrayed Stephanie Karam on the Univision-Venevisión telenovela Voltea pa' que te enamores. In 2016, Toubia began portraying the half-human, half-angel warrior Isabelle Lightwood on Freeform's fantasy series Shadowhunters, based on The Mortal Instruments book series by Cassandra Clare. That same month, she appeared alongside Prince Royce in the music video for his single "Culpa al Corazón".

Personal life
Toubia began dating musician Prince Royce in 2011. They were married in San Miguel de Allende, Mexico on November 30, 2018. The couple own a home in Studio City, Los Angeles. They announced plans to divorce in March 2022.

Toubia supports the Get Schooled non-profit organization; on May 26, 2016, she visited Middle College High School in San Bernardino, California to meet students and act as their "celebrity principal" for the day.

Filmography

Awards and nominations

References

External links
 
 
 

1989 births
21st-century American actresses
Actresses from Texas
Actresses from Montreal
American actresses of Mexican descent
American beauty pageant winners
American people of Lebanese descent
American telenovela actresses
American television actresses
Canadian emigrants to the United States
Female models from Texas
Hispanic and Latino American actresses
Hispanic and Latino American female models
Living people
Models from Montreal
People from Brownsville, Texas